Anticlea vasiliata, the variable carpet moth or early carpet, is a moth of the  family Geometridae. The species was first described by Achille Guenée in 1857. It is known from the northern part of the United States and southern Canada, from Newfoundland and Labrador to Maryland, west to California, north to British Columbia.

The wingspan is about 30 mm. It can be distinguished by the combination of a short dark streak at the apex and a protruding double loop mid-way along the postmedial line on the forewings. There usually is a white spot halfway along the subterminal line. Adults are on wing from April to June.

The larvae feed on Rubus idaeus and Rosa carolina.

References

Larentiini
Moths of North America